The sixth season of Cheers is an American television situation comedy set in a Boston bar called "Cheers". It originally aired on NBC in the United States between September 24, 1987 and May 7, 1988. The show was created by director James Burrows and writers Glen and Les Charles under their production company Charles Burrows Charles Productions, in association with Paramount Television. This season features the debut of Kirstie Alley as Rebecca Howe.

Background
Cheers survived low ratings in the first season and changes to the Thursday evening schedule of NBC's primetime block Must See TV, and retained its regular Thursday 9:00 pm Eastern / 8:00 pm Central slot. In its original broadcast run, 1987–88, Cheers was scheduled with The Cosby Show, A Different World, Night Court, and hour-long drama L.A. Law. An hour-long crime drama Hill Street Blues was moved from Thursdays to Tuesdays in 1986 and ended in 1987 after its seven-year run. The sitcom Family Ties moved from Thursday to Sundays in 1987–88.

Cast and characters
 Ted Danson as Sam Malone, a bartender and ex-baseball player. Sam sells the bar to a corporation. Six months later, he becomes the bartender again but no longer owns the bar. Since his last breakup with Diane Chambers, a former waitress, he pursues many women but fails to impress some, especially classier ones.
 Kirstie Alley as Rebecca Howe, a corporate bar owner and manager. She is attracted to the head of the Lilian Corporation, Evan Drake (Tom Skerritt), who barely notices her. At the season finale, Evan Drake moves to Japan, depriving her from going beyond her puppy love for him.
 Rhea Perlman as Carla Tortelli, a bitter waitress and mother of eight children, including five from her first marriage. Carla marries Eddie LeBec after she becomes pregnant with their twin boy and girl. (The season incorporated Rhea Perlman's real-life pregnancy, which began before the sixth season premiered. Both Perlman and Carla were pregnant in the first season and in the third.)
 John Ratzenberger as Cliff Clavin, a postal carrier and loquacious bar know-it-all. Cliff and his mother Esther (Frances Sternhagen) move out of their home when it was demolished, so they move to a condominium.
 Woody Harrelson as Woody Boyd, a dim bartender
 Kelsey Grammer as Dr. Frasier Crane, a psychiatrist who is engaged to Dr. Lilith Sternin
 George Wendt as Norm Peterson, a part-time accountant and painter

Recurring characters
 Bebe Neuwirth as Dr. Lilith Sternin, a psychiatrist and fiancée of Frasier Crane
 Jay Thomas as Eddie LeBec, a retired hockey player who currently works as an ice show performer. He marries Carla after impregnating her with a twin boy and girl.
 Timothy Williams and Mandy Ingber as Anthony and Annie Tortelli, a young, married couple. Since the cancellation of the spin-off The Tortellis, Anthony and Annie Tortelli move from Las Vegas to Boston to live with Carla. They are kicked out by Carla for having a baby at their young age.
 Tom Skerritt as Evan Drake, Rebecca's corporate boss.
 Al Rosen as Al, an elderly bar regular.

Episodes

Production 

When Cheers premiered in 1982, the creators intended it to be a comedy about a Boston bar, but they decided to focus on the romance between Sam and Diane that dominated the show for five seasons. James Burrows said the couple would have diminished the importance and relevance of the bar setting if Shelley Long had not left the show in 1987. With Diane Chambers written out in last season's finale, "I Do, Adieu", the producers planned to change the show's format without losing the bar. According to Les Charles, Sam was a straight man to Diane; with Diane gone, they made him more carefree and a "goof-off".

When Long decided to leave the show, the creators decided to find a new female lead who was unknown to television viewers, would not have blonde hair, and would not resemble Long. Brunette-haired actress Kirstie Alley, who appeared in the 1982 film Star Trek II: The Wrath of Khan, the miniseries North and South, and recent film Summer School, was one of the first actresses to audition for the role of Rebecca Howe, an executive businesswoman as Diane Chambers was originally conceived. Although Alley met all the criteria, the producers continued to audition actresses. None improved on Alley's portrayal of the character, so Alley was cast as Rebecca Howe.

Because of a Writers Guild of America strike in 1988, the season's cliffhanger finale that revolved around Sam's fears of catching AIDS from an old girlfriend was canceled. Les Charles stated that the AIDS plot was so serious that it took all the humor out of the episode. This episode was withdrawn during rehearsals and was replaced by "Backseat Becky, Up Front", which was filmed out-of-sequence.

Reception 
When the season first aired, it scored an overall 23.7 rating (21 million households) as of April 21, 1988. Ron Weiskind of Pittsburgh Post-Gazette praised Kirstie Alley's debut performance and was pleased that departing from the "Sam and Diane" story arc helped the show keep fresh. However, Weiskind criticized this season for "lacking energy and spark". He deemed the two-part episode "Little Carla, Happy at Last" "a slipshod effort with [flat lines, miscalculated situations], indifferent performances, and sagging direction".

This season has been reviewed in later years. Jeffrey Robinson of DVD Talk awarded this season four stars out of five. He praised the chemistry of Frasier and Lilith and found their stories funny; he also praised new character Rebecca Howe and old characters. He chose "I on Sports" as one of his favorites and found this season's remaining episodes "delightful [and] entertaining". David Johnson of DVD Verdict gave the acting in the season 95 percent, calling it "great". Johnson gave this season 85 percent, calling it "laugh-out-loud funny"; he praised the bar scenes, yet found scenes outside the bar "flat". Total Film gave this season four stars out of five. Todd Fuller of Sitcoms Online praised Kirstie Alley's "comedic skills" and chemistry with Ted Danson, and found the writing "similar" to other seasons, despite changes over the years.

Clifford Wheatley of IGN in 2014 ranked episodes "Bar Wars" seventh and "Home Is the Sailor" second out of his top ten Cheers episodes.

Accolades
Andy Ackerman won an Emmy Award in 1988 for an Outstanding Editing in a Multi-camera Production Series for editing the episode "The Big Kiss-Off" (1988) and was the only award winner of this season. The show was nominated as an Outstanding Comedy Series of the season. All of the cast except Bebe Neuwirth were nominated for the respective Lead and Supporting categories. "The Last Angry Mailman" (1987) earned the sound mixing crew a nomination for an Outstanding Sound Mixing for a Comedy Series or a Special. The season premiere "Home Is the Sailor" earned Glen and Les Charles a nomination for an Outstanding Writing in a Comedy Series. The season finale "Backseat Becky, Up Front" earned James Burrows a nomination for Outstanding Directing in a Comedy Series.

DVD release
Season six of Cheers has been released as a DVD boxset containing four discs. This release has no special features, interviews or commentaries. Jeffrey Robinson of DVD Talk awarded the standard of the audio and video two and a half stars out of five, calling the video "a little dirty with a trace of grain" and audio "fairly good, clear, and crisp, [but] very flat". David Johnson of DVD Verdict rated the audio and video quality 80 percent each.

Notes

References

Ratings notes
Unless otherwise, the main source of Nielsen ratings is the newspaper Pittsburgh Post-Gazette. According to that main source, ratings of 1987-88 were based on 88.6 million households that have at least one television.

External links 
 Production order of Cheers (season 6) at Copyright Catalog
 Click "Set Search Limits", select "Range", select "Motion Pictures" at "Item Type", type "1987" at left box and "1988" at right box, either hit "Enter" or click "Set Search Limits"
 Then, after above step, search by title, type "Cheers", and hit "Enter" or click "Begin search"
 Cheers, season 6 at Internet Movie Database
 Cheers, season 6 at TV Guide

6
1987 American television seasons
1988 American television seasons